Choeradoplana is a genus of land planarians found in South America.

Description 
Species of the genus Choeradoplana are characterized by the presence of a cephalic retractor muscle associated with cephalic glands, forming a cephalic musculo-glandular organ in a way similar to the one found in the genera Luteostriata and Issoca. The head of Choeradoplana is highly rolled backwards and the ventral area thus visible has two "cushions" formed by the musculo-glandular organ. This peculiar head shape makes it easy to identify a species as belonging to this genus.

Etymology 
The name Choeradoplana comes from Greek word χοιράς (scrofula) and the Latin word plana (flat) due to the two cushions on the ventral side of the head that resemble the neck swellings in patients affected by scrofula.

Species 
The genus Choeradoplana currently includes the following 24 species:

Choeradoplana abaiba Carbayo, Silva, Riutort & Álvarez-Presas, 2017
Choeradoplana agua Carbayo, Silva, Riutort & Álvarez-Presas, 2017
Choeradoplana albonigra (Riester, 1938)
Choeradoplana banga Carbayo & Froehlich, 2012
Choeradoplana benyai Lemos & Leal-Zanchet, 2014
Choeradoplana bilix Marcus, 1951
Choeradoplana bocaina Carbayo & Froehlich, 2012
Choeradoplana catua Froehlich, 1954
Choeradoplana claudioi Lago-Barcia & Carbayo, 2021
Choeradoplana crassiphalla Negrete & Brusa, 2012
Choeradoplana cyanoatria Iturralde & Leal-Zanchet, 2019
Choeradoplana ehrenreichi Graff, 1899
Choeradoplana eudoxiae Silva & Carbayo, 2021
Choeradoplana gladismariae Carbayo & Froehlich, 2012
Choeradoplana iheringi Graff, 1899
Choeradoplana langi (Dendy, 1894)
Choeradoplana longivesicula Iturralde & Leal-Zanchet, 2019
Choeradoplana marthae Froehlich, 1954
Choeradoplana minima Lemos & Leal-Zanchet, 2014
Choeradoplana onae Lago-Barcia & Carbayo, 2021
Choeradoplana pucupucu Carbayo, Silva, Riutort & Álvarez-Presas, 2017
Choeradoplana riutortae Lago-Barcia & Carbayo, 2021
Choeradoplana tristriata (Schultze & Müller, 1857)

References 

Geoplanidae
Rhabditophora genera